Budhagupta (Gupta script:  Bu-dha-gu-pta) was a Gupta emperor and the successor of Kumaragupta II. He was the son of Purugupta and was succeeded by Narasimhagupta.

Rule
Budhagupta had close ties with the rulers of Kannauj and together they sought to run the Alchon Huns (Hunas) out of the fertile plains of Northern India.

Northern India, and in particular the area of Eran, was next invaded by the Alchon Huns ruler Toramana, who set up his own inscription there, the Eran boar inscription of Toramana, circa 510-513 CE.

Inscriptions

The Damodarpur copper-plate inscription informs us that Pundravardhana bhukti (the present-day North Bengal) was ruled by his two viceroys (Uparika Mahararaja) Brahmadatta and Jayadatta.

The Eran stone pillar inscription of two brothers, Matrivishnu and Dhanyavishnu mentions Budhagupta as their emperor (Bhupati), under whom Maharaja Surashmichandra was governing the land between the Yamuna and the Narmada The Budhagupta inscription on the Eran column is on the west face towards the bottom of the lower and square part of a large monolithic red-sandstone column situated near the ruined group of temples at Eran. The inscription refers to the reign of Budhagupta over the area "between the rivers Kâlindi and Narmadâ", and it is dated 484–485 CE. The object of it is to record the erection of the column, which is called 'dhvajastambha' or flag staff of the god Vishnu. This pillar is about 48 feet high. This inscription was discovered by T.S. Burt in 1838.

A pedestal of a Buddha statue found at Govindnagar near Mathura bears an inscription "in the reign of Budhagupta in year 161" (circa 480 CE). This is the only known epigraphic evidence showing that Budhagupta's authority extended to Mathura in the north.:

Two standing Buddha images from Sarnath are known, with bear dated inscriptions mentioning the "Gift of Abhayamitra in 157 in reign of Buddhagupta" (157 of the Gupta era being 477 CE). There are also stone inscriptions in Varanasi and Eran and a seal from Nalanda mentioning Budhagupta as the ruler, as well as several copperplate inscriptions.

First Buddha statue with inscription of Budhagupta
A statue of the standing Buddha found in Sarnath has a dated inscription (year 157) in the name of Budhagupta. The content is partially preserved, but essentially identical to an inscription on a second statue, made by the same donor, allowing for reconstruction.

Second Buddha statue with inscription of Budhagupta
A second statue of the standing Buddha found in Sarnath has a dated inscription (year 157) in the name of Budhagupta. This statue is defaced, but the devotees at the feet of the Buddha are beautifully preserved. The content is partially preserved, but essentially identical to an inscription on the first statue, made by the same donor, allowing for reconstruction.

Other inscriptions of Budhagupta

References

External links
 Eran Stone Pillar Inscription of Matrivishnu and Dhanyavishnu

5th-century Indian monarchs
490s deaths
Gupta Empire
Year of birth unknown